Swiss Sailing is the national governing body for the sport of sailing in Switzerland, recognised by the International Sailing Federation.

Notable sailors
See :Category:Swiss sailors

Olympic sailing
See :Category:Olympic sailors of Switzerland

Offshore sailing
See :Category:Swiss sailors (sport)

Yacht Clubs
See :Category:Yacht clubs in Switzerland

References

External links
 Official website

Sports organizations established in 1939
Switzerland
Sailing
Sailing
1939 establishments in Switzerland